The Jiyun (Chi-yun) is a Chinese rime dictionary published in 1037 during the Song Dynasty. The chief editor Ding Du (丁度) and others expanded and revised the Guangyun. It is possible, according to Teng and Biggerstaff (1971:147), that Sima Guang completed the text in 1067. The Jiyun has 53,525 character entries (Teng & Biggerstaff, 1971: 147), approximately twice as many as the Guangyun, and likewise has 206 rime groups.

See also
Rime dictionary
Rime table

References 
 Teng, Ssu-yü and Biggerstaff, Knight. 1971. An Annotated Bibliography of Selected Chinese Reference Works, 3rd ed. Cambridge, Massachusetts: Harvard University Press. 

Chinese dictionaries
Song dynasty literature
Middle Chinese
Traditional Chinese phonology
11th-century Chinese books